The Ohlanga River is a river in KwaZulu-Natal, South Africa, which empties into the Indian Ocean just north of uMhlanga, north of Durban. The river has extensive reed beds in the estuary at its mouth, which is only 7 km southwest from the mouth of the Mdloti River. Presently, this river is part of the Mvoti to Umzimkulu Water Management Area.

Umhlanga conservancy
At the river's mouth, a lagoon is surrounded by the Umhlanga Conservancy. This area includes a  Umhlanga Lagoon Nature Reserve, and a waste treatment works which is publicly accessible. This area contains bushbuck, blue and grey duiker, and numerous birds, including the southernmost occurrence of crested guineafowl.

Huberta, the hippopotamus
Huberta, the celebrity hippopotamus, stopped at the river on her way down the coast from the St Lucia Estuary to the Eastern Cape. An attempt was made to capture her while she was there.

See also 
 List of rivers of South Africa
 List of estuaries of South Africa

References

External links
KZN Wildlife page on the Umhlanga Lagoon nature reserve
South African Birding page on bird species in the Umhlanga Conservancy
Satellite view of the river

Rivers of KwaZulu-Natal